Eina is a village in Vestre Toten Municipality in Innlandet county, Norway. The village is located along the Gjøvikbanen railway line, between the villages of Jaren and Raufoss. The river Hunnselva runs north through the village from the lake Einavatnet to the large lake Mjøsa.

About 1,500 people inhabit the rural area surrounding the lake, outside of the village of Eina.

History
The area has been populated since before the early 11th century, but did not see significant growth until the Norwegian industrialization. This was due to the Gjøvikbanen railway line being built, which brought passengers and freight to and through the village. In 1902, the local railroad station opened and it was named Eina, after the nearby lake Einavatnet. In 1908, the village of Eina and its surroundings became a municipality of its own when Vestre Toten split into three municipalities: Eina, Kolbu and Vestre Toten. The village of Eina was the administrative centre of the municipality of Eina. In 1964, Eina municipality was merged with Vestre Toten.

Valdresbanen
Eina was also connected to Valdresbanen railway line until it closed. The Valdresbanen was built in 1906, and was originally a privately owned line, until the government assumed control in 1937. It covered the distance from Eina to Fagernes, which is located in Nord-Aurdal.

References

Vestre Toten
Villages in Innlandet